The Peninsula Open Space Trust (POST) is a nonprofit land trust headquartered in Palo Alto, California.

Mission and Work 
POST mission is to protect open space on the Peninsula and in the South Bay for the benefit of all. The organization has been involved in land acquisitions in the Santa Cruz Mountains, Half Moon Bay, Coyote Valley in Santa Clara County, and farmland conservation in San Mateo County.

History 
POST was created in 1977 as a private 501(c)(3) non-profit organization able to negotiate private land sales and protective easements with willing sellers in confidence. They were created five years after the formation of the Midpeninsula Regional Open Space District to protect land for open space.

References

External links
 Peninsula Open Space Trust

Non-profit organizations based in California
Parks in the San Francisco Bay Area
Land trusts in California